Cedric Adams (May 27, 1902 – February 18, 1961) was an American broadcaster, well known in the Midwestern United States from the 1930s until his death. He was inducted into the Pavek Museum of Broadcasting's Hall of Fame in 2002. Throughout the 1930s, 1940s, and 1950s, Adams was the "best known voice" in the upper Midwest.

Personal
Adams was born in Adrian, Minnesota, and raised in Magnolia, Minnesota. He attended Central High School in Minneapolis.

Career
Adams began his career in radio in 1931 where he played a small dramatic role on WCCO Minneapolis/Saint Paul. His first newscast for WCCO was made in September 1934. He later reported the news and hosted programs such as "Stairway to Stardom", "The Phillips 66 Talent Parade", and "Dinner at the Adams'", while at the same time contenting to write for his daily newspaper column and performing for 20 radio shows each week.

On January 2, 1950, Adams began a five-minute Monday-Friday commentary on CBS radio.

Death
Adams died on February 18, 1961, at the age of 58.

References

External links

1902 births
1961 deaths
People from Adrian, Minnesota
American radio journalists
University of Minnesota alumni
Radio in Minnesota
People from Edina, Minnesota
Central High School (Minneapolis, Minnesota) alumni